Quentin Constanciel (born 13 July 2000) is a French professional footballer who plays as a centre-back for Championnat National 3 club Montlouis.

Club career
Constanciel joined Tours in 2014. He made his professional debut for the club in a 2–0 Ligue 2 loss to Auxerre on 2 February 2018.

References

External links
 
 

2000 births
Living people
Place of birth missing (living people)
French footballers
Association football central defenders
Tours FC players
Championnat National 3 players
Ligue 2 players
Championnat National players